HMAS Vampire was a V-class destroyer of the Royal Navy (RN) and Royal Australian Navy (RAN). Launched in 1917 as HMS Wallace, the ship was renamed and commissioned into the RN later that year. Vampire was loaned to the RAN in 1933, and operated as a depot tender until just before World War II. Reactivated for war service, the destroyer served in the Mediterranean as part of the Scrap Iron Flotilla, and was escorting the British warships  and  during their loss to Japanese aircraft in the South China Sea in December 1941. Vampire was sunk on 9 April 1942 by Japanese aircraft while sailing with the aircraft carrier  from Trincomalee.

Construction
The destroyer was one of five Admiralty V-class flotilla leaders ordered by the RN in the 1916–17 construction program. Originally, there were to be differences in design between the V class leaders and the rest of the V-class destroyers, but in order to save time in designing the destroyers, changes were limited to the layout of the bridge and accommodation areas.

Vampire had a standard displacement of 1,188 tons, and a deep load displacement of 1,489 tons. Propulsion machinery consisted of three White Forster boilers supplying two Brown-Curtis steam turbines, which provided  to the destroyer's two propellers. The standard ship's company was made up of 6 officers and 113 sailors.

Main armament for a V-class destroyer consisted of four QF  Mark V guns. This was supplemented by a QF 2-pounder gun (with a second installed in January 1942), two twin Lewis gun mountings, a single Lewis gun (later replaced by a 4-barrel Vickers .303 gun), and two torpedo tube sets (initially 3-tube, later replaced by 4-tube sets). Four depth charge chutes were fitted during construction, with two depth charge throwers installed later; the destroyer could carry up to 50 charges.

The ship was laid down as HMS Wallace by J. Samuel White & Co Ltd at Cowes on the Isle of Wight on 10 October 1916, and was launched on 21 May 1917. In July 1917, the ship was renamed Vampire, and was commissioned into the RN on 22 September 1917.

Operational history

RN service
On entering service, Vampire was initially assigned to the 4th Destroyer Flotilla. After the end of World War I, the destroyer saw service in British waters and the Mediterranean.

Transfer to RAN

The five vessels were paid off from RN service at Portsmouth, England on 11 October 1933, and were commissioned into the RAN on the same day. Less than a week later, the ships left for Australia, arriving in Sydney on 21 December. Vampire was paid off into reserve on 31 January 1934, but was recommissioned for three days in mid-July to be sailed down to Flinders Naval Depot for use as a tender. The destroyer remained in "reserve commission" until 11 May 1938, when she was recommissioned for full service.

World War II – Mediterranean
Vampire operated in Australian waters until the start of World War II, and on 14 October 1939, joined her sister ships and Stuart (a force nicknamed the "Scrap Iron Flotilla") as they were deployed to the Mediterranean Theatre. From her arrival until April 1940, Vampire was primarily assigned to convoy escort duties between Malta and Marseilles. The destroyer operated as an escort and anti-submarine patrol ship from the end of April, and escorted the British aircraft carrier  during the Battle of Calabria on 9 July. The only damage sustained by Vampire was the result of near misses and splinters caused by Italian aircraft bombing Eagle: an RN torpedo gunner aboard the destroyer became the first fatality of the war aboard a RAN ship when he died three days later from splinter wounds.

After repairs in Alexandria, Vampire resumed escort and patrol duties, and on several occasions was unsuccessfully used in attempts to lure the Italian fleet to where they could be engaged by the Allies. In late October and early November, the early phases of the Battle of Greece, the destroyer escorted convoys in Greek waters, before being deployed to aid the Western Desert Campaign as an escort. On 20 December, Vampire stripped her engines, forcing the destroyer to dock for repairs. These were completed on 8 January 1941.

Vampire was sent back to Greece, where she operated until May, aiding in the Allied reinforcement (Operation Lustre) and evacuation (Operation Demon). She was then deployed back to the Western Desert Campaign, operating as part of the "Tobruk Ferry Service"; ships transporting supplies and reinforcements to the Allied-controlled, besieged town of Tobruk.

The ship sailed to Singapore for major repairs, which lasted until late 1941. In September, Commander William Moran was appointed captain of Vampire.

World War II – British Eastern Fleet

In December 1941, she joined to the British Eastern Fleet at Colombo, Ceylon. Early in the morning of 8 December (Singapore time), Singapore came under attack by Japanese aircraft. Repulse and the British battleship , which were in the harbor at the time, shot back with anti-aircraft fire; no planes were shot down, and the ships sustained no damage. After receiving the reports of the attack on Pearl Harbor and invasions of Siam by the Japanese, Force Z (consisting of Prince of Wales and Repulse, escorted by Vampire, and Tenedos) put to sea at 17:30 hours on 8 December.

At 20:55 hours, Admiral Philips cancelled the operation, and ordered the force to return to Singapore. The next morning, 10 December, they received a report of Japanese landings at Kuantan, and Express was sent to investigate the area, finding nothing. That afternoon, Prince of Wales and Repulse were attacked and sunk by 85 Japanese aircraft off Kuantan by aircraft from the 22nd Air Flotilla based at Saigon. Vampire rescued 225 of the ships' 2,081 survivors from the sea, and transported them to Singapore.

Reaching the Japanese convoy at 02:00 the next morning, the two destroyers found the troopships were protected by the cruiser  and six destroyers. The allied destroyers attempted to escape: Vampire was successful, but Thanet was sunk.

On 11 February, Vampire was attached to Eastern Fleet forces operating in the Indian Ocean. At the start of April, Vampire was ordered to escort the British aircraft carrier  from Ceylon, as the Japanese presence in the area was likely to become dominant.

Loss

Following the Japanese Fast Carrier Task Force's attack on Colombo in early April, Hermes and Vampire were ordered to depart Trincomalee to avoid a follow-up strike. Sailing on 8 April, the two ships avoided the aerial bombing of the port early the next morning, but were spotted and attacked by 85 Japanese Aichi D3A Val dive bombers escorted by 9 Mitsubishi A6M Zero fighter carrier aircraft at 10:35.

Hermes was attacked by 45 bombers  and sustained 40 hits or very near misses and was lost within twenty minutes. Vampire came under attack by 16 Vals and claimed to have shot down at least one aircraft but was hit or near missed by all sixteen 250 kg bombs, breaking in half and sinking 10 minutes after Hermes, her ensign the last to submerge. Despite the ferocity of the attack, Vampires commanding officer and eight sailors were the only fatalities. The survivors from both Hermes and Vampire were recovered by the hospital ship Vita.

Vampire was awarded five battle honours for her wartime service: "Calabria 1940", "Libya 1940–41", "Greece 1941", "Crete 1941", and "Indian Ocean 1941–42".

Citations

References

Further reading

External links

 Royal Australian Navy webpage for HMAS Vampire (I)

V and W-class destroyers of the Royal Navy
Ships built on the Isle of Wight
1917 ships
World War I destroyers of the United Kingdom
V and W-class destroyers of the Royal Australian Navy
World War II shipwrecks in the Indian Ocean
World War II destroyers of Australia
Destroyers sunk by aircraft
Maritime incidents in April 1942
Ships sunk by Japanese aircraft